James Alexander Bonfanti (born December 17, 1948 in Windber, Pennsylvania) is a rock drummer who is best known for having been a member of the band Raspberries.

Career 
Bonfanti's music career began in 1965 when he saw The Beatles on The Ed Sullivan Show, which eventually led him to join a band called "The Mods", later renamed The Choir. Their recording of "It’s Cold Outside" reached the national charts in 1967. In 1970, Bonfanti, Wally Bryson, Dave Smalley and Eric Carmen formed  Raspberries. Together they produced four albums, eight singles, and a U.S. top ten and gold record for their major hit "Go All the Way".

Following two albums both released in 1972, creative tension came to a head sparked largely by Carmen's creative dominance over the contributions of fellow members. After the release of the Raspberries' third album, Side 3, Smalley and Bonfanti left the Raspberries to form their own band, Dynamite.

, Bonfanti resides in Mentor, Ohio.

References

External links

1948 births
Living people
People from Windber, Pennsylvania
Musicians from Pennsylvania
20th-century American drummers
American male drummers
20th-century American male musicians